The Schynige Platte (Scheinige Platte on the old Siegfried Map) is a small mountain ridge and a viewpoint in the Bernese Highlands and belongs to the Schwarzhorn group. The mountain range consists of three peaks: Gumihorn, Tuba, and the closest summit next to the viewpoint, Geiss.

It is notable for its hotel and, since 1893, its mountain railway, one of the highest in Switzerland. In good weather conditions there are views to many surrounding mountains, including the Eiger, Mönch, Jungfrau, and others giants of the Bernese Alps. Also, the town of Interlaken and the two great lakes of Thun and Brienz are visible to the north,  lower.

The area is accessible via the Schynige Platte railway, which runs from Wilderswil, where connection is made with Bernese Oberland railway trains from Interlaken. Northeast of the station is the Schynige Platte alpine botanical garden, specialising in the display of, and research into, the high altitude flora of Switzerland.

A number of short loop trails extend north from the train station, reaching several view points, all within one kilometre from each other. Directly above the station and hotel, and overlooking the valleys of Lauterbrunnen and Grindelwald, is the Geiss summit. Further north, and overlooking Interlaken and the two great lakes, are the Tuba and Oberberghorn summits. The highest summit in the Schynige Platte area, between the Daube and Geiss summits, the tower-like Gumihorn peak, cannot be reached by pedestrians. The Schynige Platte is also the starting point for the popular hiking trails to Loucherhorn, Faulhorn or First which is connected to Grindelwald by a gondola lift.

Administratively, the area is shared between the municipalities of Gündlischwand and Gsteigwiler, the tripoint between the municipalities of Bönigen, Gündlischwand and Gsteigwiler being on the Tuba summit. All the municipalities are in the canton of Bern.

References

External links

 Walks from Schynige Platte
 Schynige Platte Bahn website

Bernese Oberland
Mountains of the Alps
Mountains of Switzerland
Tourist attractions in Switzerland
Mountains of the canton of Bern
Two-thousanders of Switzerland